Christian Jaeger Cappis (born August 13, 1999) is an American professional soccer player who plays as a midfielder for Brøndby IF in the Danish Superliga.

Club career

FC Dallas 
Cappis started to play soccer for academy club, Texans SC. In 2017, his club won the "2016–17 US Developmental Academy U17/18 Championship" with him being named "Central Conference Player of the Year".

As a result of his performance on this tournament, he and Chris Richards, who was also part of the team, were approached by FC Dallas's academy and in the same year, they signed with the club. After several good performances at the Dallas Academy, the club showed interest in sign him a professional contract. However, the move was prevented by MLS due to the Homegrown Player Rule which prevents academy players from signing with clubs far from their native town. As Cappis is from Greater Houston, Houston Dynamo was supposed to have priority in signing the player.

Hobro 
However, instead of signing with any team on MLS, Cappis went to trial with several clubs in Europe. On November 6, 2018, he signed his first professional contract with Danish Superliga team, Hobro IK. On the same day, he debuted for the team in a match against OB at the 2018–19 Danish Cup. Cappis started the game and provided an assist in his teams 4–2 defeat, before he was replaced in the 56th minute by Edgar Babayan. On February 10, 2019, Cappis debuted in the Danish Superliga when he replaced Martin Mikkelsen at the 88th minute of a match against AC Horsens. Cappis scored his first goal on March 8, 2020 for Hobro. 

At the end of the 2019–20 season, Hobro was relegated to the Danish 1st Division. In December, Hobro failed to renew Cappis' work permit and lead to Cappis' passport being revoked and at facing deportation form Denmark.

Brøndby
Cappis signed a four-year contract with Danish Superliga club Brøndby in February 2021 starting July 1, 2021. He joined the club ahead of the 2021–22 season. He made his debut against AGF on 18 July, coming on as a second-half substitute for Rezan Corlu in a 1–1 draw. Cappis scored his first goal for Brøndby in a 2–2 draw against Vejle on 1 August.

International career
Cappis was called up to the United States senior squad in January 2020 for a friendly against Costa Rica but did not appear in the match. He received another call-up in March 2021 for two friendly matches against Jamaica and Northern Ireland, respectively, with both games taking place in Europe.

Career statistics

Club

References

External links
 
 
 
 Christian Cappis at FC Dallas
 Christian Cappis at United States Soccer Federation

1999 births
Living people
Association football midfielders
People from Katy, Texas
American people of Italian descent
Soccer players from Texas
American soccer players
American expatriate soccer players
United States men's youth international soccer players
United States men's under-20 international soccer players
Hobro IK players
Brøndby IF players
Danish Superliga players
Danish 1st Division players
American expatriate sportspeople in Denmark
Expatriate men's footballers in Denmark